Peace, Love & Truth is a compilation album of music celebrating John Lennon and Yoko Ono's songs for peace, released only in Asian and Australian markets in August 2005.  In place of this release for the rest of the world, Working Class Hero: The Definitive Lennon was issued in October of the same year.

This album has been released with the Copy Control protection system in some regions.

Track listing
All songs by John Lennon, except where noted.
"Give Peace a Chance (Remix 2005)" – 6:11
 Featuring The Voices of Asia
"Gimme Some Truth" – 3:16
"Love" – 3:22
"Hold On" – 1:53
"Give Peace a Chance 2004: ONO" – 3:54
"Imagine" (John Lennon/Yoko Ono) – 3:04
"Bring on the Lucy" – 4:13
"Mind Games" – 4:13
"Don't Want to Be a Soldier (Remix)" – 6:04
"Instant Karma!" – 3:20
"Power to the People" – 3:23
"Real Love" (Speech Removed) – 4:08
"Help Me to Help Myself" – 2:09
"I Don't Wanna Face It" – 3:23
"Bless You" – 4:37
"Happy Xmas (War Is Over)" (Ono/Lennon) – 3:34
"Listen the Snow Is Falling" (Yoko Ono) – 3:10
"Give Peace a Chance" – 4:54

Notes

External links

John Lennon compilation albums
Compilation albums published posthumously
2005 compilation albums
EMI Records compilation albums